George Godolphin Osborne, 8th Duke of Leeds (16 July 1802 – 8 August 1872) was a British peer.

Early life and background 
Lord Leeds was born at Gogmagog Hills, Cambridgeshire, the eldest son of Lord Francis Osborne and his wife, The Hon. Elizabeth Eden. Lord Leeds's father, Lord Francis, was the second son and youngest child of Francis Osborne, 5th Duke of Leeds, and his wife, the former Lady Amelia Darcy. Lord Leeds's mother was the daughter of William Eden, 1st Baron Auckland.

In 1832, his father was created Baron Godolphin, upon which George became known as The Hon. George Osborne. When the 1st Baron Godolphin died in 1850, George succeeded his father and became the 2nd Baron Godolphin of Farnham Royal co. Buckingham. 

Nine years later, George's cousin, the 7th Duke of Leeds, died without issue; George therefore inherited the Dukedom of Leeds, thus becoming styled His Grace The Duke of Leeds. With the Dukedom of Leeds, George also inherited the titles Earl of Danby co. York, Viscount Osborne of Dunblane, 4 May  1859, Baron Osborne of Kiveton co. York, Marquess of Carmarthen, Viscount Latimer of Danby co. York, and Baronet Osborne of Kiveton co. York. 

Although the dukedom had passed to George, the Baronies of Conyers and Darcy de Knayth and the Portuguese countship of Mértola were passed to his cousin Sackville Lane-Fox. Lane-Fox was the son of George's father's elder sister, Mary Pelham, Countess of Chichester; and as those peerages allowed for succession in the female line, they passed to Lane-Fox. The Godolphin barony and the dukedom remained united until the death of the last Duke of Leeds in 1964, when both titles became extinct.

Marriage and issue 

On 21 October 1824, he married Harriet Emma Arundel Stewart at the British Embassy in Paris. She was an illegitimate daughter of Granville Leveson-Gower, 1st Earl Granville, by Lady Henrietta Frances Spencer, wife of the 3rd Earl of Bessborough. Harriet Stewart was thus a maternal half-sister of Lady Caroline Lamb.

With Harriet Stewart, he had eight children:

 Sir George Godolphin Osborne, 9th Duke of Leeds (11 August 1828 –23 December 1895); succeeded his father as the 9th Duke in 1872. He married on 16 January 1861 Hon. Frances Georgiana Pitt-Rivers, daughter of George Pitt-Rivers, 4th Baron Rivers of Sudeley Castle and Lady Susan Georgiana Leveson-Gower (herself a daughter of Granville Leveson-Gower, 1st Earl Granville); had issue. He was succeeded in the dukedom by his second surviving son, George Osborne, 10th Duke of Leeds.
 Reverend Lord Francis George Godolphin Osborne (6 April 1830 –6 March 1907); married on 4 July 1854 Matilda Katharine Rich (d. 19 January 1914), and had one daughter.
 Lady Susan Georgina Godolphin Osborne (6 April 1830 –14 November 1903); married on 22 June 1864 Henry John Milbank (1824-1872), son of Mark Milbank and Lady Augusta Henrietta Vane (daughter of William Vane, 1st Duke of Cleveland); had issue.
 Major Lord D'Arcy Godolphin Osborne (14 June 1834 –20 March 1895); married Annie Allhusen on 6 December 1887.
 Lord William Godolphin Osborne (28 August 1835 –28 December 1888); married on 8 September 1859 Mary Catherine Headley and had issue.
 Lady Emma Charlotte Godolphin Osborne (1837 –24 May 1906)
 Lady Charlotte Godolphin Osborne (1838 –25 March 1914)
 Lady Blanche Godolphin Osborne (1842 –13 February 1917); married on 16 September 1869 General Charles Henry Morris, son of Sir John Morris, 2nd Bt. and Hon. Lucy Juliana Byng; had two daughters.

Later life and death 
The 8th Duke of Leeds died on 8 August 1872 at the age of 70 at Gog Magog Hills, Cambridgeshire, England. He was buried in the Osborne family chapel at All Hallows Church, Harthill, South Yorkshire.

References

1802 births
1872 deaths
George
108
Eldest sons of British hereditary barons
Burials at Osborne family chapel, All Hallows' Church (Harthill)